The Mercedes-Benz GLE, formerly Mercedes-Benz M-Class (designated with the "ML" nomenclature), is a mid-size luxury SUV produced by the German manufacturer Mercedes-Benz since 1997. In terms of size, it is slotted in between the smaller GLC and the larger GLS, the latter with which it shares platforms.

The first-generation M-Class, designated with the model code W163, is a body-on-frame SUV and was produced until 2004. For a short time, between 1999 and 2002, the W163 M-Class was also built by Magna Steyr in Graz, Austria, for the European market, before all production moved to the U.S. plant near Vance, Alabama. The second-generation M-Class (W164) moved to a unibody platform while sharing most components with the GL-Class, which sports a longer body to accommodate third-row seating.

Since April 2015, the M-Class has been renamed to the GLE with the release of the facelifted W166 model, in an effort to harmonize Mercedes-Benz SUV nameplates by aligning it with the E-Class.

Nomenclature update from M to GLE 
Although grouped under the "M-Class" naming banner since the first launch, BMW, who sells M models such as the M3, objected to the car being badged "M" with the three-digit engine level afterwards (e.g. M 320). This forced Mercedes-Benz to defer to a double-tiered marketing strategy of "ML" badging (e.g. ML 320) under an M-Class umbrella. There has been some confusion surrounding this nomenclature, with many sources erroneously referring to the series as the "ML-Class", including Mercedes-Benz itself.

From 2015, with the release of the facelifted W166 third-generation model at the New York Auto Show in April, the M-Class was renamed to GLE as per the revised nomenclature adopted by the brand. Under this scheme, SUVs use the base name "GL", followed by the model's placement in Mercedes-Benz hierarchy. The "G" is for Geländewagen (German for off land wagon or off-road vehicle) and alludes the long-running G-Wagen. This is followed by the letter "L" that acts as a linkage with the letter "E"—the GLE being the SUV equivalent to the E-Class.

First generation (W163; 1997)

Development 
Mercedes-Benz proposed a plan to replace the G-Class, which at the time had been in production for 11 years. A joint agreement with Mitsubishi Motors to develop and produce a sports-utility vehicle was made in early 1991 and was confirmed publicly that June. Plans were made to base it on the Montero/Pajero platform, with one of them being badged as a Mercedes-Benz and the other a Mitsubishi. In May 1992, these plans were abandoned citing "technical problems" and Mercedes-Benz continued on with in-house development from January 1993.

In March 1993, a search for a location to build a U.S. manufacturing plant began. By September 1993, a location in the state of Alabama was chosen and construction started in 1994.

While plans were being made overseas, in Germany development continued. Design work took place from late 1992 to 1994. A design from Mercedes' Sindelfingen studio was chosen in 1993 and approved by the executive board in February 1994. The design patents were filed in Germany on 13 July 1994, and in the U.S. on 13 January 1995. Prototype testing started with test mules and crash tests using mock-ups in May 1994. First functional prototype's crash test took place in February 1995, with full testing run from March 1995 to December 1996 in various climates and regions of the world. Pilot production began in May 1996.

In July 1996, construction on the Mercedes-Benz U.S. International plant in Vance, Alabama concluded, with the very first production M-Class rolling off the assembly line the week of 9 February 1997.

Initial release 
Mercedes-Benz launched the first generation W163 series M-Class on 19 February 1997, in the United States for the 1998 model year, with sales beginning that September. It is a mid-sized body-on-frame SUV with seating for five, or seven with an optional third-row, seven-seat version. Access to the third-row was deemed problematic and the seats were not suitable for large adults. As the result, the seven seater ML-Class was discontinued after the 2005 model year and replaced by the larger GL-Class.

The Mercedes-Benz M-Class (W163) was available with permanent 4Matic four-wheel drive, which routed torque to all four wheels through all open front, center, and rear differentials. The system used a two-speed dual range BorgWarner 4409 transfer case with reduction gearing, and Mercedes' new Four-wheel Electronic Traction System (4-ETS). 4-ETS simulated three differential locks on all three open differentials, via aggressively braking one or more spinning wheels.

The M-Class was the first luxury SUV to feature electronic stability control, a system designed to detect loss of control and instantaneously intervene with selective braking to bring the vehicle back on its intended course. Furthermore, the M-Class boasted front- and side-impact airbags with advanced occupant detection for the front passenger seat, which helped earn the W163 the highest marks in insurance industry crash tests.

Manufactured in Vance, Alabama, in the United States, the M-Class launched in the North American market first as the ML 320. The ML 320 was sold internationally, with the "320" suffix alluding to the 3.2-litre V6 engine. An entry-level, manual transmission-only ML 230, fitted with a 2.3-litre inline-four was available in Europe from launch in March 1998 until 2000. From launch in 1998, European markets also received the ML 270 CDI with a 2.7-litre inline-five turbodiesel engine. This unit was made available in Australia in 2000 and continued on in the W163 until being replaced upon the release of the W164 M-Class in 2005.

Later, in 1998, the more powerful ML 430 became available with the newly introduced Mercedes-Benz 4.3-litre V8. This was followed by the February 1999 debut of the 2000 ML 55 AMG, featuring a 5.4-litre V8 engine made by AMG, modified bodywork, and other performance features.

In September 1996, before the vehicle was launched, Mercedes-Benz allowed the producers of the 1997 film The Lost World: Jurassic Park to make use of modified pre-production M-Class SUVs as a way to advertise the W163 when it was launched in 1997. As a result, a Mercedes-Benz advertisement appears before the film on original VHS copies of the film. Jeff Goldblum, the star of the film, received a complimentary ML 320 from Mercedes-Benz as a result of the tie-in. Three versions were used in the movie, of which 2 copies of each were built. Two are displayed at the Universal Studios in Orlando, Florida, there is one at the Mercedes-Benz Museum in Stuttgart, Germany, and one at the Visitor Center at the M-class factory in Alabama.

Awards 
The ML 320 was Motor Trend magazine's Truck of the Year for 1998 and was voted the 1998 North American Truck of the Year at the North American International Auto Show, Detroit, in January 1998. It also received the World Car Award in March 1999, voted by an international jury of automotive journalists in Geneva. Despite the accolades, Mercedes-Benz received considerable criticism with respect to the substandard quality of the W163, resulting in the car being nicknamed Alabama Trashcan.  Quality improved over the years, especially after the facelift in 2001 for the 2002 model year. DaimlerChrysler spent US$600 million on improvements at the Alabama factory before launching the second generation ML in 2005.

Engines (1997–2005)

Facelift 

Mercedes-Benz revised and updated the W163 in 2001 for the 2002 model year. Styling updates involved the fitment of new head- and tail-lamp lenses, front and rear bumpers, new alloy wheels on most variants, the relocation of the side turn signals from the fenders to the side-view mirrors, and various interior trim changes. At the same time, the ML 430 was replaced by the 5.0-litre V8-powered ML 500 and a new 4.0-litre V8 turbodiesel ML 400 CDI became available in Europe. The following year, in 2002, Mercedes-Benz launched the ML 350 fitted with a 3.7-litre V6 engine. The ML 350 replaced the ML 320 in some markets, but supplemented it in others.

The previous Popemobile was based on a W163 series ML 430 and has been in service since July 2002. Volkswagen had offered to build a new vehicle based on the Touareg, but Pope Benedict XVI opted to continue using his predecessor's Mercedes-Benz-manufactured vehicle.

Second generation (W164; 2005) 

In 1999, development on a successor to the W163 began under the codename "W164" and spanned a period of six years. First design drafts appeared in 2000 with the first models in scale 1:4, and in 2001 three full-sized models were prepared. In 2002 the design styled by Steve Mattin under Peter Pfeiffer was chosen and approved by the executive board. Design patents were filed in Germany on 10 June 2003 and in the U.S. on 25 July. Prototype testing was conducted throughout 2003 and 2004, concluding in early 2005. The redesigned M-class (chassis name W164) was introduced in April 2005 as a 2006 model after a showing at the North American International Auto Show in January. It was almost entirely new, with a more sporting, aerodynamic look. The coefficient of drag was reduced to 0.34. Mercedes-Benz made the new M-Class 71 mm larger, 150 mm longer and 5 mm lower than the first model. The M-Class was named "Best New Sport Utility Vehicle" in the 2006 Canadian Car of the Year awards.

Mercedes-Benz extensively publicised the US$600 million spent to update its factory and add manufacturing space for the new R-Class. According to early automotive press reports, the 2006 M-Class vehicles demonstrated vast improvements in quality.

The W164 platform used for the new M-Class is shared with the new GL-Class and is a unibody type rather than the former (W163) body-on-frame used by the M-Class vehicles produced from 1998–2005. The X164 GL-Class, a longer seven-seater version of the W164 platform, is also available.

New features in the 2006 M-Class include the 7G-Tronic seven-speed automatic transmission, optional Active Curve-Illuminating Bi-Xenon headlights which "steer" in the path of the vehicle, and an adjustable-height air suspension. The manual transmission has been dropped. Permanent 4Matic four-wheel drive remained, with one-speed transfer case (no low range), center limited-slip differential and four-wheel electronic traction system (4-ETS). In most countries except the U.S., an Off-Road Pro package with center and rear differential locks, 4-ETS, two-speed transfer case with reduction gearing, and adjustable ground clearance was available as an option increasing the original fording depth from 500 mm to 600 mm.

The AMG version of the W164, the ML 63 AMG, was introduced at the 2006 North American International Auto Show as a limited edition 2007 model. It features a 6.2 L M156 V8 engine producing  and  that is handcrafted in Germany. The engine is added to an AMG Speedshift 7G-Tronic seven-speed automatic transmission. These impressive features made the ML 63 AMG the most powerful naturally aspirated V8 SUV in the world.

Facelift 

By 2007, design work on updates to the W164 were finalized and patented domestically in Germany on 23 November 2007. The 2009 Mercedes-Benz M-Class got a minor facelift as it debuted at the 2008 New York International Auto Show in March 2008.

This facelift includes new front headlights, redesigned front and rear bumpers, new exterior mirrors, new rim choices, a larger front grille, restyled interior, and a new ML 420 CDI engine choice. The ML 280 CDI became the ML 300 CDI, the 320 CDI became the 350 CDI, and the 420 CDI became the 450 CDI.

Models using Bluetec Diesel engine with urea injection were introduced in 2008 for the 2009 model year.

At the 2009 New York International Auto Show, Mercedes-Benz showed their ML 450 Hybrid SUV, which was announced on 8 April 2009. The ML 450 Hybrid consumes almost 50% less fuel than the ML 550 does, even though it produces over 90% of the power generated by the V8 model. The engine itself runs on the Atkinson cycle and by itself makes 275 hp. The ML 450 was developed under the Global Hybrid Cooperation, and will only be available in the United States under lease.

In 2011, Mercedes-Benz came out with their flagship SUV model, the Mercedes-Benz M BlueTec Grand Edition. The vehicle had cosmetic changes, including specially-manufactured 22-inch 10 spoke wheels, black leather with white stitching, and smokers package with Grand Edition modeling. The exterior consisted of new wheels, tinted headlights and tail lights, xenon-package (LED tail lights and daytime running lights, Xenon headlights), black grille, AMG, and side-view mirrors. The Grand Edition was offered in Midnight Blue, Black, and Ivory White, differentiating the basic model by colour already. The interior had changes, including deletion of the heated steering wheel and the replacement with an AMG steering wheel.

Engines (2005-2011)

Third generation (W166; 2011) 

In 2006, development began on the next-generation M-Class and spanned over a period of 5 years, a shorter duration than its predecessor. In 2008, the final design by Emiel Burki was approved and patented domestically on 16 December 2008 (U.S. design patent filed on 15 June 2009). The newly redesigned M-Class (chassis name W166) was introduced in pre-production form 10 June 2011 as a 2012 model. The first customer-designated W166 rolled off the Vance production line on 20 July. It is moderately refined, taking styling cues from the new generation Mercedes-Benz E-Class. An increase in rear seat legroom has been implemented, alongside adjustable rear backrests. It was to be launched in September 2011.

New features in the 2012 M-Class include an updated 7G-Tronic Plus seven-speed automatic transmission to provide improved fuel economy, optional adaptive cruise control (Distronic Plus), active lane departure warning system, and an adjustable-height air suspension (AirMatic). An active curve system with active anti-roll bars for body roll compensation was introduced.

The W166 was one of the last vestiges of the joint venture between Daimler and Chrysler while they were a consolidated company. DaimlerChrysler developed the core platform and technology, benefitting from Chrysler's strong SUV sales and R&D domestically. The underlying platform work was largely completed in 2006, as the two companies were separated. Chrysler uses the same platform to power the Jeep Grand Cherokee (WK2) and Dodge Durango. Because of the separation however, the cars are extremely different in terms of interior and body design as well as engine choices. Aside from engines, the three SUVs share many powertrain components, including some transmissions.

An On&Off Road Package is available for most markets (now including North America) as of the 2013 model year. The package adds a two-speed dual range Magna Powertrain transfer case with center differential lock, reduction gearing, underbody skid plates, and a 6-mode selectable terrain driving program system. The rear differential lock has been discontinued.

Open front and rear differentials are fitted, and use four-wheel electronic traction system (4-ETS) to simulate front and rear differential locks.

The Mercedes M-Class won first place in the "Luxury Crossover SUV" category and has been named the most ideal vehicle for Americans based on a study undertaken by California-based automotive research and consulting firm AutoPacific.

Mercedes-Benz India established a manufacturing plant in Chakan, Pune in early 2009 that rolled out the first W166 M-Class to be built outside the US in October 2012. In the following month, Mercedes-Benz Indonesia began M-Class assembly at a factory in Wanaherang, West Java. These plants perform final assembly of vehicles shipped as "knocked-down" kits from Vance, USA.

In the second half of 2015 a facelifted W166 was released as the GLE, along with a coupé version.

The previous Popemobile was based on the 2012 M-Class and was delivered in December 2012.

Engines (2012–2019)

Facelift (GLE) 

The GLE name was used in 2015 for the facelifted W166 along with the new five-door coupé derivative GLE Coupé (C292) which was unveiled to the public in January 2015 at the North American International Auto Show. As part of Mercedes-Benz's new naming strategy, the GLE will define the SUV's positioning in the middle of its segment and between the future GLC and GLS (the former GLK and GL, respectively), the same way the E-Class is positioned in relation to the C and S-Classes.

Body variants

SUV (W166) 
The W166 facelift was unveiled at the New York Auto Show. The GLE 500 e is the first plug-in hybrid in this model range, combining a 333 hp V6 engine with a 116 hp electric motor. The first 19 units were delivered in the American market in June 2016.

Coupe (C292) 
The GLE Coupé (C292) is the coupé SUV version and is heavily related to the W166, sharing its platform, mechanicals and interior (but having a unique body with a similar design). The C292 coupe was unveiled to the public in January 2015 at the North American International Auto Show, it was discontinued in August 2019 after the introduction of the W167.

The GLE Coupé was built in Alabama with the GLE on which it is based. Sales are expected from the second half of 2015. The range is topped by the Mercedes-AMG GLE 63 S-Model, powered by 5.5-litre twin turbo V8 producing 585 bhp and 768 Nm of torque, making it one of the quickest of its type.

Safety 

1 vehicle structure rated "Acceptable"
2 strength-to-weight ratio: 6.68

Fourth generation (W167/V167; 2019) 

The fourth generation GLE was unveiled at the 2018 Paris Motor Show.

At launch, the GLE was sold in the U.S. with two engine options. The GLE 450 has a 48V electric system with an integrated starter motor. The system powers the air-conditioner, in-car electronics and the electronically driven turbocharger. The GLE 450 features a refined Active Body Control system, that does away with mechanical roll bars, notably enhancing performance.

Other engine options are also available. The AMG GLE 53 was introduced at the 2019 Geneva Motor Show in March. A 48V electric system like in the GLE 450 features EQ Boost for an extra  and  torque on demand.

For the first time, the GLE also adds a seven-seat option.

Plug-in hybrid
In the European market, two plug-in hybrid versions are available: the GLE 350e, using a petrol engine, and the GLE 350de, using a diesel engine. Both use a 31.2-kWh battery. The vehicle can be equipped with a 60 kW quick charging option.

Long-wheelbase (V167)
The fourth-generation GLE saw the introduction of a long-wheelbase (LWB) variant, which as of 2020 is currently only sold in India. The LWB has a wheelbase that is 8 centimetres longer than that of the standard version. The variant is still designed as a default 2-row SUV, with most (69 mm) of the additional length being put into use in the second row. Available powertrains include a 2.0-litre turbodiesel (300d), 3.0-litre turbodiesel (400d), and 3.0-litre petrol (450), all making the same power as in the short-wheelbase (SWB) counterparts.

In India, the LWB's only market, the SWB variant is not marketed. Mercedes currently has no plans on bringing the LWB to Europe or North America.

Engines

Sales

References

Notes

Bibliography

General

Workshop manuals

External links 

 Official website

GLE
All-wheel-drive vehicles
Crossover sport utility vehicles
Mid-size sport utility vehicles
Luxury crossover sport utility vehicles
Luxury sport utility vehicles
Euro NCAP large off-road
Motor vehicles manufactured in the United States
Cars introduced in 1997
Plug-in hybrid vehicles
2000s cars
2010s cars
2020s cars